Kaynan Casemiro Duarte (born January 24, 1998) is a Brazilian submission grappler and Brazilian jiu-jitsu (BJJ) black belt competitor. Duarte is a two-time champion at both the ADCC Submission Fighting World Championship and World IBJJF Jiu-Jitsu Championship in the Heavyweight division.

Background 

Duarte was born on January 24, 1998, in Pederneiras, São Paulo, Brazil.

During his pre-teens, Duarte developed an interest in martial arts and started attending Judo classes. From there and through his cousin he learnt about Brazilian jiu-jitsu and transitioned to the sport.

Grappling Career 

Duarte's first instructor was José Luis and Duarate moved to various places to train with different people in order to expand his knowledge on the sport. During his visits to  São Paulo, he met Paulo Ledesma who was associated with Atos Jiu-Jitsu. Eventually in 2016, Duarte moved to San Diego, California to join Atos Jiu-Jitsu under André Galvão. Galvão who served as Duarte's coach promoted Duarte to Black Belt in 2018 after Duarte won the 2018 World IBJJF Jiu-Jitsu Championship in both the Brown Belt heavyweight and absolute divisions. Duarte received his black belt only one year after his promotion to brown belt.

In the 2019 ADCC World Championship, Duarte defeated Eldar Rafigaev, Yuri Simoes, Marcus Almeida and Nick Rodriguez to become champion in the heavyweight division. Duarte also competed in the absolute division but suffered an upset loss in the first round against welterweight Lachlan Giles after being submitted by a heel hook.

Duarte suffered another shocking upset in the 2021 Who's Number One tournament. Going in as a heavy favorite, he defeated Kyle Boehm and Giancarlo Bodoni.  In the final he faced unranked Tim Spriggs and was submitted by a heel hook.

in the 2022 ADCC World Championship, Duarte won his second championship by defeating Owen Livesey, Elder Cruz, Rafael Lovato Jr. and Craig Jones  to become champion in the light heavyweight division.

On January 29, 2023 Duarte won gold medals in both the super-heavyweight division and the absolute division of the 2023 IBJJF European Championship.

Controversies 

On February 7, 2020, the United States Anti-Doping Agency announced Duarte had tested positive for  Ostarine following a post-match drug test at 2019 World IBJJF Jiu-Jitsu Championship.  Duarte who was champion in heavyweight division for that year was stripped of his Gold Medal and banned from competing in IBJJF events for one year. Duarte claimed the intake of Ostarine was not intentional.

Competitive summary 
Main Achievements:

As black belt:

 ADCC Submission Fighting World Championship (Champion in 2019 and 2022)
 World IBJJF Jiu-Jitsu Championship (Champion (heavyweight) and Third place (absolute) in 2021, Champion in 2022)
 World IBJJF Jiu-Jitsu No-Gi Championship (Champion in 2018)
 Pan IBJJF Jiu-Jitsu Championship (Champion in 2019)
 Pan IBJJF Jiu-Jitsu No-Gi Championship (Champion (super heavyweight and absolute) in 2020, Second place (absolute) and Third place (super heavyweight) in 2018)
 European IBJJF Jiu-Jitsu Championship (Champion (heavyweight) and Third place (Absolute) in 2019)
 Abu Dhabi World Professional Jiu-Jitsu Championship (Champion 2019)
 Who's Number One (Second place in 2021)
Main Achievements:

In colored belts:

 World IBJJF Jiu-Jitsu Championship  (Champion in 2017 (purple) and 2018 (brown heavyweight and absolute))
 World IBJJF Jiu-Jitsu No-Gi Championship (Champion in 2017 (purple) and 2018 (brown))
 Pan IBJJF Jiu-Jitsu Championship  (Champion in 2017 (purple) and 2018 (brown))
 European IBJJF Jiu-Jitsu Championship (Champion (brown absolute) and Second Place (brown heavyweight) in 2018)

Instructor lineage 
Mitsuyo "Count Koma" Maeda → Carlos Gracie, Sr. → Helio Gracie → Rolls Gracie → Romero "Jacare" Cavalcanti → Alexandre Paiva → Fernando "Tererê" Augusto →  André Galvao →  Kaynan Duarte

See also 
List of Brazilian Jiu-Jitsu practitioners

References 

Living people
1998 births
20th-century Brazilian people
21st-century Brazilian people
ADCC Submission Fighting World Champions (men)
Brazilian practitioners of Brazilian jiu-jitsu
Brazilian submission wrestlers
People awarded a black belt in Brazilian jiu-jitsu
Sportspeople from São Paulo
World Brazilian Jiu-Jitsu Championship medalists
World No-Gi Brazilian Jiu-Jitsu Championship medalists